Azadi Ka Amrit Mahotsav or 75th Anniversary of Indian Independence was an event, in which the 75th Anniversary of the Independence of India was celebrated in India and abroad. It was 76th Independence Day of India.

Summary 

The Government of India decided to celebrate the 75 years of Independence of India, with tribute to people instrumental in bringing India thus far in its journey, in the spirit of Self-reliant India. It is the initiative to celebrate and commemorate 75 years of independence from British rule and the history of India's people, culture and achievements. The commemoration is to be celebrated through a series of events organized by the Government of India. Prime Minister of India Narendra Modi inaugurated the celebration on 12 March 2021 with a 'Padyatra' (march) at Sabarmati Ashram with a 75-week countdown to its 75th anniversary of independence and it will continue till 2023 ending on 15th August 2023.

There are five themes of the 'Azadi Ka Amrit Mahotsav', mainly:

 Freedom struggle: It focuses on and celebrates the countless freedom fighters who had helped India achieve freedom from the British. Programs under this theme include Birsa Munda Jayanti (Janjatiya Gaurav Diwas), Declaration of Provisional Government of Free India by Netaji, Shaheed Diwas etc.
 Ideas@75: This theme brings into spotlight the programs and events inspired by ideas and ideals that have shaped India so far and are to influence for next 25 years (till India's 100th Independence day, named Amrit Kaal'). The events and initiatives in this section include Kashi Utsav and Post Cards to Prime Minister.
 Resolve@75: This theme focuses on the collective resolve and determination to shape the destiny of India. Events and programs under this theme include initiatives such as Constitution Day, Good Governance Week etc.
 Actions@75: This theme focuses on all the efforts that are currently being undertaken by the Government to take India to carving out its position at the world level. It has a motto: SABKA SAATH. SABKA VIKAS. SABKA VISHWAS, SABKA PRAYAS. The events and initiatives under this include Pradhan Mantri Gati Shakti – a National Master Plan for Multi-modal Connectivity, WEPNxt: An Initiative to Nurture Women Entrepreneurship etc.
 Achievements@75: This theme highlights all the milestones and collective achievements achieved since India's ancient history along the way till today's 75-year-old independent country. Events and programs under this theme include initiatives such as Swarnim Vijay Varsh dedicated to the victory of 1971, launch of Shreshtha Yojana during Mahaparinirvan Diwas etc.

In the usual ceremonial practice the Prime Minister of India hoist the flag from Red Fort at Delhi followed by speech on achievements and proud moments as a people of this country.
 
The individual states and cities of India will also celebrate the same at their local level. Thane, one of the popular cities of India, has created its own version of 'Utsav 75' at Thane, which will be held from 12 to 15 August and spread all over the city. The celebrations include various programs, performances, various rallies, community carnivals, etc. On 31 July 2022, in Man Ki Baat Prime Minister of India urges Indians to replace their social media profile picture with the Flag of India. from 2 August to 15 August.

The government of India also started a campaign Har Ghar Tiranga under the auspices of 'Azadi Ka Amrit Mahotsav' to endorse people to bring the flag home and hoist it to mark the 75th year of India's independence. Zainul Abideen ultra runner create record for (Longest Tiranga Run of India) by run 555 km Prayagraj to Moradabad on occasion of Independence Day and create awareness of clean Ganga.

See also 
 Partition Horrors Remembrance Day

References

External links 
 
 

Independence days
2022 in India